The men's triple jump at the 2014 European Athletics Championships took place at the Letzigrund on 12 and 14 August.

Medalists

Records

Schedule

Results

Qualification

Qualification: Qualification Performance 16.65 (Q) or at least 12 best performers advance to the final

Final

References

Qualification Results
Final Results

Triple Jump M
Triple jump at the European Athletics Championships